The Sutherland Australian Football Club is an Australian rules football club based in the Sydney region of the Sutherland Shire.
The Southern Power (as they are known) play their home games at Lincoln Oval (Waratah Park No. 4) in Sutherland. The club competes in the Sydney AFL competition, with 3 Men's and 1 Women's sides. Seniors compete in the Sydney AFL Platinum Division, Reserves in Platinum Division Reserves, Under 19s Division 2 and Women's Premier Division. There are also Youth Girls teams.

Formation
Sutherland Australian Football Club Inc. was founded in 1972 in the Sydney Football Association (SFA). Founding members included Kerry and Rob Mowlam (Rob was the First President), Ray Jemmeson, Graham Baldock and Bill Free.  The club was known as the Southern Sharks until 2008 when, at an Extraordinary General Meeting, the club members voted unanimously to change their name to the Southern Power.  Reasons behind the change included a desire for the Senior and Under 18's teams to play under the same team colours and emblem, and also a wish for the team differentiate itself from the many other teams in the region who had the Shark as their emblem.

History
After the consolidation of the SFA and SFL leagues in Sydney, the club ended up with teams in Division 2, Division 3 and U18s Division 2.

1st Grade
Sydney AFL Division 1 (2011–present), Sydney AFL Division 2 (2007-2010)

The team was elevated to Division 1 in 2011 after a long string of success which included 3 Division 2 Grand Final appearances in 2007,2009,2010 and a Premiership in 2010 against UTS Bats.  The elevation to Division 1 in 2011 did not slow the club down and again the team made the Grand Final only to fall short of Manly Wolves by 10pts. The team again finished runners up in 2012, before triumphing over UNSW as premiers in 2013, with a Grand Final score of 105 to 20.

2nd Grade
Sydney AFL Division 3 (2007–present)

3rd Grade
Sydney AFL Division 4 (2010, 2012–present), Sydney AFL Division 5 (2011)

During 2010 the club experienced significant growth and consequently added a 3rd grade team which competed in Division 4.  The 3rd graders finished 12th of 14 teams, with 5 wins from 18 games in their debut season.  This resulted in the team being relegated to Division 5 in 2011.

However 2011 produced a marked improvement in the team through the addition of extra depth by new players and also another preseason under the belt of the returning fleet.  The 3rd grade team finished top of the ladder and became undefeated Division 5 2011 Premiers when they defeated Manly Wolves by 14pts in the Grand Final.  This premiership success resulted in the team being promoted back to Division 4 for the 2012 season.

Under 19's
Sydney AFL U19's Division 2 (2007–present)

Women's
Sydney Women's AFL (2010–present)

Club colours
The club's colours represent the southern Sydney region colloquially known as the Shire.  The colours are light blue (teal), black and white, with a hand holding a lightning bolts the team emblem.  While these colours (and guernseys) have morphed over the years, they remain essentially the same as they have since the club's foundation.

Home Grounds
Past - Gwawley Park, Taren Point

Originally & Present - Lincoln Oval (Waratah Park No. 4), Sutherland

Premierships
1984 - Sydney AFL SFA First Division Seniors - Premiers
1984 - Sydney AFL SFA First Division Reserves - Premiers
1986 - Sydney AFL SFA First Division Reserves - Premiers
2010 - Sydney AFL Division Two - Premiers
2011 - Sydney AFL Division Five - Premiers
2012 - Sydney AFL Under 18s Division 2 - Premiers
2013 - Sydney AFL Division One - Premiers
2018 - Sydney AFL Platinum Division Reserves - Premiers
2019 - Sydney AFL Platinum Division Seniors - Premiers
2019 - Sydney AFL Platinum Division Reserves - Premiers

External links
 

Australian rules football clubs in Sydney
1972 establishments in Australia
Australian rules football clubs established in 1972